Michael Ballantyne (born 17 March 1948) is a South African cricketer. He played in 29 first-class and 3 List A matches for Border from 1974/75 to 1985/86.

See also
 List of Border representative cricketers

References

External links
 

1948 births
Living people
South African cricketers
Border cricketers
Cricketers from East London, Eastern Cape